Acta Numerica is a mathematics journal publishing research on numerical analysis. It was established in 1992 to publish widely accessible summaries of recent advances in the field.
One volume is published each year, consisting of review and survey articles from authors invited by the journal's editorial board.

The journal is indexed by Mathematical Reviews and Zentralblatt MATH. During the period of 2004–2009, it had an MCQ of 3.43, the highest of all journals indexed by Mathematical Reviews over that period of time.

References

Similar Journals
 Mathematics of Computation (published by the American Mathematical Society)
 Journal of Computational and Applied Mathematics
 BIT Numerical Mathematics
 Numerische Mathematik
 Journals from the Society for Industrial and Applied Mathematics
 SIAM Journal on Numerical Analysis
 SIAM Journal on Scientific Computing

External links 
 

Mathematics journals
Annual journals
English-language journals
Cambridge University Press academic journals
Publications established in 1992